Freilla is a genus of moths of the family Erebidae. The genus was erected by Herbert Druce in 1890.

Species
Freilla abjecta Schaus, 1912 Guyana
Freilla abluta Schaus, 1912 French Guiana
Freilla conjuncta (Möschler, 1889) Suriname
Freilla humeralis H. Druce, 1890 Mexico, Guatemala, Panama
Freilla rufipuncta Hampson, 1926 Peru
Freilla variabilis H. Druce, 1890 Mexico

References

Calpinae